Antonín Procházka is a Czech film, television and stage actor, playwright and director.

Biography 
Procházka was born 25 December 1953 in Kroměříž, Czechoslovakia. He studied at the Faculty of Theatre of the Academy of Performing Arts in Prague. He is husband of actress Štěpánka Křesťanová and father of actor Antonín Procházka jr. Procházka has written 13 stage plays, largely comedies.

Theatre

J. K. Tyl Theatre, Plzeň 
Kouzlo 4D (2013-???) .... 
The Dresser (22 June 2013-????) .... Norman
Celebrity, s.r.o. .... 
Ve státním zájmu .... ???
Přes přísný zákaz dotýká se sněhu (2005-2012) .... Emil
Věrní abonenti .... ???
With your not daughter (1996) .... ???
Queen Margot .... Charles IX.
I Served the King of England .... Jan Dítě
King Lear .... Clown
Chekhov in Jalta .... Anton Pavlovich Chekhov
Rozmarné léto .... Roch
Marriage .... Kočkarev
Jakub a jeho pán .... Jakub, servant
Pokoušení .... Fistulo
Mandragora .... Ligurio
Amadeus .... Wolfgang Amadeus Mozart
Closely Watched Trains .... Hrma

Plays

Original plays 
 Klíče na neděli (Keys on Sunday)
 Fatální bratři (Fatal Brothers)
 S tvojí dcerou ne (With your not Daughter)
 Vraždy a něžnosti (Murders and Tenderness)
 Věrní abonenti (Staunch Constituency)
 Holka nebo kluk (A Girl or a Boy)
 Ještě jednou, profesore (At Once, Professor)
 Kristián II. (Christian II.)
 Přes přísný zákaz dotýká se sněhu (He Touched a Snow Through Strict Ban)
 Láska je láska (Love Is Love)
 Celebrity s.r.o. (Celebrity, Inc.)
 Ve státním zájmu (In the National Interest'')

References

External links 
Website of Musical Theatre in Karlín
Czechoslovak Film Database
Website of Harlekýn Agency
Film Database
Rozkvetlé konvalinky
xKultura.cz Interview with Antonín Procházka

1953 births
Living people
Czech male stage actors
20th-century Czech dramatists and playwrights
Czech male dramatists and playwrights
Czech theatre directors
Academy of Performing Arts in Prague alumni
People from Kroměříž